See You in Valhalla is a 2015 American drama film written by Brent A. Tarnol and directed by Jarret Tarnol and starring Sarah Hyland, Steve Howey, Odeya Rush, Bret Harrison, and Emma Bell.

Plot
After the bizarre death of her brother, Johanna Burwood must return home after four years, to face her strange siblings, her out-of-touch father and her very touchy past.

Cast
 Sarah Hyland as Johana Burwood
 Bret Harrison as Barry Burwood 
 Steve Howey as Makewi 
 Odeya Rush as Ashley Burwood
 Jake McDorman as Magnus Burwood
 Michael Weston as Don Burwood
 Conor O'Farrell as Woody Burwood
 Alex Frost as Peter
 Emma Bell as Faye
 Beau Mirchoff as Johnny
 Allie Gonino as Tori

External links
 
 
 AllMovie

American drama films
2015 drama films
2015 films
2010s English-language films
2010s American films